Baboo may refer to:

An alternative spelling of the Indian honorific Babu
Baboo (airline), an airline based in Grand-Saconnex, Switzerland
Baboo (Travel Platform), an online platform for sutainable tailor-made travel around the world
Baboo (band), 1990s Taiwan rock band
A villain in the Power Rangers, fictional universe
Baboo English, a dialect of English

People
Baboo Da Silva (born 1967), Brazilian kyokushin kaikan full contact karate practitioner, former professional kickboxer and mixed martial artist
Baboo Nimal (1908–1998), Indian field hockey player 
Dinesh Baboo, Indian film director, cinematographer, producer, actor and screenwriter
Sweet Baboo, real name Stephen Black, musician from Wales
Baboo Lal Verma (born 1955), an Indian politician
 Baboo Khan, Indian politician

See also
Babou (disambiguation)
Babu (disambiguation)